OEA may refer to:
Oea, the Phoenician name for Tripoli, Libya
Office of Economic Adjustment
Ohio Education Association
Oleoylethanolamide, an endogenous peroxisome proliferator-activated receptor alpha (PPAR -α) agonist 
Oregon Education Association
Organización de los Estados Americanos (Organization of American States), a group dedicated to strengthening ties in the western hemisphere
O'Neal Airport's IATA code
Operadora Estatal de Aeropuertos, a Mexican airline agency and owner of Hermanos Serdán International Airport
Office of the Employment Advocate, Australian agency now subsumed under the Workplace Authority